Hamayoon Khan is a Pakistani popular Pashto musician and singer from Peshawar, Khyber Pakhtunkhwa. He is also featured in Coke Studio Season 5.

Humayun has sung many songs for AVT Khyber, the most popular ones are La me che zargi ta ranizde na ve and Gule Ro Ro Raza. He also sang a folk song fusing it with pop music: Larsha Pekhawar Ta.

References

Pakistani male singers
Pashto-language singers
Pashtun people
People from Peshawar
Year of birth missing (living people)
Living people